Mahesiadigi is a village in the Deori CD Block in Khori Mahuwa subdivision of Giridih district, in the Indian state of Jharkhand.

The Village, surrounded with greenery, consist of people of all the classes. 
 
Kayastha people are the leaders of this Village. Shiv Dham which is 150 years old is the most popular and known temple of the village and the nearby areas. Durga Puja is the main festival celebrated in this village by the Kayasth family and the others.  Once in a year the local people, along with Kayasth families who have moved to other states and towns for their livelihood, get together and perform Dussehra  with great harmony. Along with this,  Maha Shivaratri is also celebrated in a grand way. Krishna Janmashtami, Ramnavmi and many other festivals maintain their same importance.  Apart from this it is a secular belief of this village that the entire village is protected by a holy spirit the GOD of the Village,  Diwan Baba. People of this village (upper and the lower castes) perform a one-day dedication  ceremony to Diwan Baba. involvement of females are not allowed in the worshipping spot of Diwan Baba.

References

Villages in Giridih district